The Wagar Women's Pairs North American bridge championship is held at the summer American Contract Bridge League (ACBL) North American Bridge Championship (NABC).

The Wagar Women's Pairs started in 2017 when it replaced the Wagar Women's Knockout Teams was dropped from the schedule.
The event is restricted to female players.

Winners

References

North American Bridge Championships